Muriel Peak is a 12,937-foot-elevation (3,943 meter) double summit mountain located in the Sierra Nevada mountain range in Fresno County, California, United States. The true summit is set within the John Muir Wilderness on land managed by Sierra National Forest, whereas the slightly lower south summit is on the boundary shared with Kings Canyon National Park. It is situated one mile northeast of Mount Goethe and one mile south of Muriel Lake.

History
The first ascent of the summit was made July 8, 1933, by Hervey Voge, who also named this mountain. The landform's toponym has been officially adopted by the U.S. Board on Geographic Names, and was named in association with Muriel Lake which had previously been adopted in 1911. The origin of the lake's etymology is a mystery, but was likely applied during a 1907–09 USGS topographic survey.

Climate
According to the Köppen climate classification system, Muriel Peak is located in an alpine climate zone. Most weather fronts originate in the Pacific Ocean, and travel east toward the Sierra Nevada mountains. As fronts approach, they are forced upward by the peaks (orographic lift), causing them to drop their moisture in the form of rain or snowfall onto the range. Precipitation runoff from this mountain drains north into headwaters of Piute Creek which is a tributary of the South Fork San Joaquin River.

Gallery

See also
 
List of mountain peaks of California

References

External links
 Weather forecast: Muriel Peak
 Muriel Peak (photo): Flickr

Sierra National Forest
Mountains of Fresno County, California
Mountains of the John Muir Wilderness
North American 3000 m summits
Mountains of Northern California
Sierra Nevada (United States)